Courts of Nebraska include:
;State courts of Nebraska
Nebraska Supreme Court
Nebraska Court of Appeals
Nebraska District Courts (12 districts)
Nebraska County Courts (93 courts, one for each county)
Nebraska Juvenile Courts
Nebraska Workers' Compensation Court
Nebraska Problem-Solving Courts and Drug Courts
Nebraska Small Claims Courts

Federal courts located in Nebraska
United States District Court for the District of Nebraska

See also 
 Nebraska Attorney General

References

External links
National Center for State Courts – directory of state court websites.

Nebraska
Government of Nebraska